Oak Lake is an unincorporated urban community in the Rural Municipality of Sifton within the Canadian province of Manitoba that held town status prior to January 1, 2015. The lake after which it was named is in the rural municipality's western area.

During the late 19th century, the area around Oak Lake was a popular stopping point for fur traders and settlers due to the large number of big oak trees (revered for their strength) located around the lake that could be used to repair their wagons.

In the fall of 1881, work crews on the transcontinental Canadian Pacific Railway had reached Flat Creek to the east of the current townsite. In the spring they moved the camp west and built a siding and station (now long gone) where the community's flags and flower garden are now located.

Geography and climate 

The area around Oak Lake is dominated by the Assiniboine River, the nearby lake by the same name, areas of flat farm land, and to the north, large, rolling hills left by receding glaciers. Oak Lake's location in the middle of the Canadian prairies means that Oak Lake experiences an extreme continental climate. The area is known for its long, cold winters owing to its northerly location. There is often much snowfall during the winter, with the possibility for blizzards that can drop in excess of 35 cm (~14 inches) of snow at once, which can be blown into drifts that are much deeper. The community can be cut off for a day or more while snow is cleared from the highways.

Temperatures during the coldest winter months of December, January and February can reach -35 °C (-31 °F), though colder temperatures occasionally occur. Windchills during the winter can reach as cold as -45 °C (-49 °F), making outdoor activity difficult on those days. The average winter temperature is a more moderate -12 °C (10.4 °F). Winters are often characterized by extreme shifts in temperature with near 0 °C (32 °F) changing to frigid temperatures within the span of a few days. Summers are often very warm with the possibility of temperatures in excess of 35 °C (95 °F), though the average summer temperature is 26 °C (78.8 °F). Year round, Oak Lake has an abundance of clear, sunny skies.

Economy 

The economy of the Oak Lake area is dominated by farming, although nearby Virden has a booming oil economy. The rural municipality office is located in Oak Lake, which employs a handful of people to manage the running of public services. Other employers include the Valleyview CO-OP grocery store, Golden Embers restaurant, Dandy's confectionery, and several smaller, personal businesses.

Basic groceries and household items can be purchased from the Co-op. Other locations for shopping are Virden, 15 minutes away, Brandon, 30 minutes away, and for rare items, Winnipeg and Minot each 2½ hours away. Oak Lake has the seasonal Dandy's Drive In and Golden Embers. Virden and Brandon have a number of casual and fine dining restaurants as well.

Demographics 

Oak Lake's population is mostly white, with few visible minorities other than a small aboriginal population. The nearby Sioux Valley Dakota Nation and Canupawakpa Dakota Nation are homes to a large community of First Nations people.

Education 
Oak Lake Community School is the only school in Oak Lake. It is part of the Fort La Bosse School Division, and has grades K-8. Students in their senior years (grades 9-12) take a daily 15 minute bus ride to nearby Virden Collegiate Institute in Virden. The closest post secondary educational facilities are in Brandon; Brandon University (BU) and Assiniboine Community College (ACC).

Transportation 
The main method of transportation in Oak Lake is car. For people who live and work in community, walking or biking is common when the weather permits. The nearest domestic airport is Virden/R.J. (Bob) Andrew Field Regional Aerodrome, and the nearest one with scheduled service is Brandon Municipal Airport. The closest international airport is the Winnipeg James Armstrong Richardson International Airport, although Regina International Airport in Regina, Saskatchewan is only marginally further away. There is no commuter rail service to Oak Lake, although Via Rail has a stop in Brandon.

Sports and recreation 
Oak Lake Golf Course is nine holes long with cart and club rentals available. Camping is available in the community at the Lion's Campground and D & G Campground can be found west along the Trans-Canada highway. Oak Lake Beach (Four Seasons Island Resort) is a short drive from the community and offers cabins (both for rental and lease), camping, a beach, minigolf and other cottage attractions. During the winter, there are plenty of opportunities for snowmobiling, skating (including figure skating), skiing and ice fishing.

Hockey 
Hockey is the biggest sport in the community, with an active minor league program. The local arena and hockey program has greatly benefited from the installation of an ice plant. Ice rentals by teams from Brandon are common. Oxen Cart Bandits is the moniker used by teams in younger age groups. The Oak Lake Icemen participate in the Manitoba North Central Hockey League senior level. There are junior hockey programs available in Virden and Souris. Virden Collegiate has a male high school hockey program.

The closest major hockey franchise is the Brandon Wheat Kings who play in the Western Hockey League. The nearest NHL franchise is the Winnipeg Jets. After Winnipeg, the closest NHL franchise is the Calgary Flames and the Edmonton Oilers, although the Minnesota Wild are geographically closer.

Baseball 
Oak Lake formerly had a vibrant baseball program, but it has seen decline in recent years. The closest active baseball program can be found in Virden. Virden Collegiate has male and female high school baseball programs.

Soccer 
Brandon's city soccer league is the only viable choice for soccer in the area.

Football 
Brandon has a youth football team, while Virden Collegiate Institute's Golden Bears football team participates in the Rural Manitoba Football League.

Curling 
There are several regional curling competitions in Oak Lake and surrounding communities. Virden Collegiate also fields a curling team for high school competition.

Volleyball 
Volleyball is a school sport at both Oak Lake Community School (whose team name is the Oak Lake Raptors) and at Virden Collegiate. There is also a regional league for males and females.

Basketball 
Basketball is a school sport at both Oak Lake Community School and Virden Collegiate.

Entertainment and media

Television 
Oak Lake is serviced by Persona Communications cable television, which offers 25 channels. Reception of satellite TV is excellent, due to the flat landscape devoid of large obstructions, therefore services such as Bell Satellite TV work for more channels. Over the air reception is available from the following stations:
Channel 2 – CKND-2 - Global, a repeater of Global Winnipeg.
Channel 4 – CKYB - CTV, a repeater of CKY-TV Winnipeg. 
Channel 21 – CBWFT - Societé Radio-Canada, a repeater of CBWFT Winnipeg.

Radio 
91.5 CIWM – NCI – Native Communications Inc. (community/aboriginal)
92.7 CBWS – CBC Radio 2 – classical music
94.7 CKLF – Star FM – adult contemporary
96.1 CKX-FM – 96.1 BOB FM – adult hits
97.9 CBWV – CBC Radio One – News/Information
99.5 CKSB-8 – Première Chaîne – French News/Information
101.1 CKXA – 101 The Farm – country
103.3 CJVM – CJ103 Radio – country and local news
106.5 CJJJ – CJ106 – Assiniboine Community College campus radio
880 CKLQ – country – official sportscast of the Brandon Wheat Kings

Newspapers 
The Oak Lake Town and Country News is the community's current paper detailing local happenings. The Brandon Sun is the only home delivered regional, national and international newspaper in the area.

Theatres 
Virden's Aud theatre is the closest live performance theatre.

Notable people 
Maurice Strong (born April 29, 1929 - died November 28, 2015) - industrialist, diplomat and Under-Secretary General of the UN
Ted Taylor (born February 25, 1942) - hockey player, played in the WHA and NHL
Don Larway (born February 12, 1954) - hockey player, played in the WHA, signed to NHL but never played

References

External links 

 Official site

Designated places in Manitoba
Former towns in Manitoba
Populated places disestablished in 2015
2015 disestablishments in Manitoba
Unincorporated communities in Westman Region